Tomáš Cízek (born 27 November 1978) is a Czech former professional footballer who played as a midfielder.

He played, among others, for Jablonec, Pelikán Děčín, and Sparta Prague in the Czech Republic, and for Rubin Kazan, FC Moscow, and Alania Vladikavkaz in Russia.

References

External links
 Player page on the official FC Moscow website 
 
 
 
 

1978 births
Living people
People from Děčín
Czech footballers
Czech expatriate footballers
Association football midfielders
Czech First League players
Russian Premier League players
FK Jablonec players
AC Sparta Prague players
FC Rubin Kazan players
FC Moscow players
FC Spartak Vladikavkaz players
FC Sibir Novosibirsk players
Expatriate footballers in Russia
Sportspeople from the Ústí nad Labem Region